Molybdenum(IV) fluoride is a binary compound of molybdenum and fluorine with the chemical formula MoF4.

References

Molybdenum(IV) compounds
Fluorides
Molybdenum halides